Carole Gene "Candy" Spelling (née Marer; born September 20, 1945) is an American author, theater producer, and philanthropist.  She was married to Aaron Spelling from 1968 until his death in 2006.

Early life and education
Carole Gene Marer was born in Beverly Hills, California, to Augusta (née Rosen) and Merritt Marer, and grew up in a Jewish home. She has an elder brother, Anthony Marer (born July 24, 1942). Her father was a salesman who founded a chain of furniture stores. Although initially successful, the chain failed as a result of overexpansion. She attended Beverly Hills High School and Chouinard Art Institute in Los Angeles.

Books and television
Spelling's autobiography, Stories from Candyland, released in March 2009, hit The New York Times best seller list two weeks after publication.  Her memoir, Candy at Last, was published by Wiley in May 2014.  She has written for TMZ and the Huffington Post, among others.

In December 2011 and January 2012, Spelling produced and starred in Selling Spelling Manor, a two-episode special for HGTV that documented the process of moving from and selling her 123-room, 56,500 square foot home.  In 2013,  she produced and starred in Beyond Spelling  Manor,  a three-episode series about the construction of her subsequent residence, a  $35m condominium, and her search for an apartment in New York City.  The series also aired on HGTV.

Broadway
Spelling began producing theater on Broadway in 2010.  Her first co-production, Promises, Promises, starred Sean Hayes and Kristin Chenoweth and was nominated for four Tony Awards.  Her second Broadway show, How to Succeed in Business Without Really Trying opened with Daniel Radcliffe in the lead role.  In 2012, she produced Nice Work If You Can Get It,  which was nominated for 10 Tony Awards and won for Featured Actor (Michael McGrath) and Featured Actress (Judy Kaye).  2013's After Midnight,  based on Duke Ellington's years at the Cotton Club, was nominated for seven Tony Awards with Warren Carlyle winning for Outstanding Choreography.

Spelling went on to produce The Color Purple, the winner of the 2016 Tony Award for Best Revival of a Musical. Cynthia Erivo, who portrayed the character Celie, won the Tony for Best Performance by an Actress in a Leading Role in a Musical. In 2018, her production credits included The Iceman Cometh,  which starred Denzel Washington and received eight Tony Award nominations; the revival of the Rodgers and Hammerstein musical, Carousel, which received Tony Awards for Best Featured Actress in a Musical (Lindsay Mendez) and Best Choreography (Justin Peck); and Three Tall Women  by Edward Albee, which earned Tony Awards for Laurie Metcalf (Featured Actress) and Glenda Jackson (Lead Actress).

Philanthropy
In 2012 Spelling was named to the board of directors of American Humane, an animal welfare organization. She was named vice chair of the board in 2015.  She is a member of the UCLA Health System Board, a member of the board of the Los Angeles World Affairs Council, and a founding board member of the Los Angeles Parks Foundation. She helped to expand Centro De Niños, downtown Los Angeles daycare center for underprivileged families, and served for 10 years as a Board of Governors Member of LA's Best, an after-school enrichment program for children in need.  She was honored for her public service by  the President's Council of Service and Civic Participation.

Personal life
She married producer and screenwriter Aaron Spelling in 1968. The couple had two children: daughter Victoria Davey ("Tori") (born 1973) and son Randy Gene Spelling (born 1978). They appeared in several of Aaron's productions, most notably in Beverly Hills, 90210. She has seven grandchildren, five from Tori and two from Randy.

In 2009, three years after her husband's death, Spelling put their Holmby Hills mansion on the market for $150 million. It was the most expensive residential listing in the United States at the time.  It was sold to Petra Ecclestone for $85 million in 2011.

References

External links
 Official Candy Spelling website

Living people
1945 births
Beverly Hills High School alumni
People from Beverly Hills, California
Writers from Los Angeles
HuffPost writers and columnists
American philanthropists
American socialites
Jewish American writers
Jewish women writers
American women columnists
21st-century American women writers
Spelling family
American people of Hungarian-Jewish descent
American cheerleaders
Housewives
American women non-fiction writers
People from Holmby Hills, Los Angeles